Clofibrate (trade name Atromid-S) is a lipid-lowering agent used for controlling the high cholesterol and triacylglyceride level in the blood. It belongs to the class of fibrates. It increases lipoprotein lipase activity to promote the conversion of VLDL to LDL, and hence reduce the level of VLDL. It can increase the level of HDL as well.

It was patented in 1958 by Imperial Chemical Industries and approved for medical use in 1963. Clofibrate was discontinued in 2002 due to adverse effects.

Complications and controversies
It can induce SIADH, syndrome of inappropriate secretion of antidiuretic hormone ADH (vasopressin). Clofibrate can also result in formation of cholesterol stones in the gallbladder.

The World Health Organization Cooperative Trial on Primary Prevention of Ischaemic Heart Disease using clofibrate to lower serum cholesterol observed excess mortality in the clofibrate-treated group despite successful cholesterol lowering (47% more deaths during treatment with clofibrate and 5% after treatment with clofibrate) than the non-treated high cholesterol group. These deaths were due to a wide variety of causes other than heart disease, and remain "unexplained".

References 

2-Methyl-2-phenoxypropanoic acid derivatives
Prodrugs
Chloroarenes